Qanat-e Baqer Beyk (also Romanized as Qanāt-e Bāqer Beyk; also known as Bāqerīn Kandī) is a village in Bastam Rural District, in the Central District of Chaypareh County, West Azerbaijan Province, Iran. At the 2006 census, its population was 442, in 104 families.

References 

Populated places in Chaypareh County